This is a List of squadrons and flotillas of the Royal Navy.

Type squadrons

Aircraft carriers

Numbered
 1st Aircraft Carrier Squadron – British Pacific Fleet, East Indies Fleet (1945–1947)
 2nd Aircraft Carrier Squadron – Mediterranean Fleet
 3rd Aircraft Carrier Squadron – listed in Flight, 20 April 1951, p. 483 with Home Fleet. Commanded at the time by then Rear-Admiral Caspar John.
 11th Aircraft Carrier Squadron – Rear Admiral Cecil Harcourt hoisted his flag in HMS Colossus in August 1945, commanding the 11th Aircraft Carrier Squadron (HMS Colossus, and ). This force was sent to re-occupy Hong Kong.
 21st Aircraft Carrier Squadron – Eastern Fleet, East Indies Fleet
 30th Aircraft Carrier Squadron – Fleet Train, British Pacific Fleet, August 1945.

Named
 East Indies and Egypt Seaplane Squadron, (1916–1918) was the Royal Navy's first carrier squadron.

Battleships

 1st Battle Squadron-1914 Grand Fleet
 2nd Battle Squadron-1914 Grand Fleet, 1919 Atlantic Fleet. 1932 Home Fleet
 3rd Battle Squadron-1914 Grand Fleet, 1919 Atlantic Fleet, 1932 Home Fleet
 4th Battle Squadron-1914 Grand Fleet
 5th Battle Squadron-1914 Grand Fleet
 6th Battle Squadron-1914 Grand Fleet
 7th Battle Squadron-1912–1914 Third Fleet
 8th Battle Squadron-1912–1914 Third Fleet
 9th Battle Squadron-1914 Grand Fleet

Battlecruisers

 1st Battlecruiser Squadron-1913 Grand Fleet.
 2nd Battlecruiser Squadron-1914 Mediterranean Fleet, 1915 Grand Fleet.
 3rd Battlecruiser Squadron-1915 Grand Fleet
 British Battlecruiser Squadron-1919–1932 Atlantic Fleet-1932 Home Fleet.

Cruisers
Starting around the time that steam cruisers became popular in the 1870s, the Royal Navy tended to organise such ships into groups called Cruiser Squadrons. Squadrons were commanded by a rear-admiral whose title was given as Flag Officer Cruiser Squadron n, or CSn for short (e.g. the officer commanding the 3rd Cruiser Squadron would be CS3).

During peacetime the grouping was primarily for administrative purposes, but during war the whole squadron tended to be operated as a unified fighting unit and such units would train in this formation during peace. In the main fighting fleets (Home Fleet and Mediterranean Fleet) members of a given squadron were normally of the same or similar classes. The use of Cruiser Squadrons died out as the number of such ships decreased following World War II.

 1st Cruiser Squadron-1939 Mediterranean Fleet, Second World War and afterwards – Mountbatten?
HMS Dorsetshire, HMS York and HMS Exeter in 1932.
 3rd Cruiser Squadron- Mediterranean Fleet
 5th Cruiser Squadron-1939 China Station   HMS Kent HMS Birmingham. Post World War II Flag Officer Commanding was for a period an additional appointment for Flag Officer Second in Command Far East Fleet.
 6th Cruiser Squadron, also known as Mediterranean Cruiser Squadron, (1909–1915), (1925–1942) deployments -1939 South Atlantic Station
 7th Cruiser Squadron, also known as Cruiser Force C, (1912–1914) deployments -1940 Mediterranean Fleet HMS Gloucester, HMS Neptune, HMS Orion, and HMS Liverpool. On 21 June 1940, Bardia was bombarded by the 7th Cruiser Squadron of the Mediterranean Fleet. However the bombardment is reported to have only caused minimal damage. 
 8th Cruiser Squadron, (1912–1914, (1924/25-1942) deployments-1939 West Indies Station
 9th Cruiser Squadron -also known as Cruiser Force I, (1913–1919), (1940)
 10th Cruiser Squadron – First World War operated Northern Patrol checking trade routes to Germany
 11th Cruiser Squadron also known as Cruiser Force B – (1912–1917)
 12th Cruiser Squadron also known as Cruiser Force G – (1914–1915), (1939–1943)
 15th Cruiser Squadron, (1940–1946) Components in 1942 Mediterranean Fleet HMS Cleopatra, Arethusa, Dido, Euryalus and Orion
 18th Cruiser Squadron, (1939–1942). Deployments -1939 Home Fleet. Home Fleet/Nore 1940 – War Diary March–May 1940

Light Cruisers
 1st Light Cruiser Squadron (United Kingdom)
 2nd Light Cruiser Squadron (United Kingdom)
 3rd Light Cruiser Squadron (United Kingdom)
 4th Light Cruiser Squadron (United Kingdom)
 5th Light Cruiser Squadron (United Kingdom)
 6th Light Cruiser Squadron (United Kingdom)
 7th Light Cruiser Squadron (United Kingdom)

Defence boats

 British 1st Seaward Defence Boat Squadron

Destroyers
 1st Destroyer Squadron (United Kingdom)
 2nd Destroyer Squadron (United Kingdom)
 3rd Destroyer Squadron (United Kingdom)
 4th Destroyer Squadron (United Kingdom)
 5th Destroyer Squadron (United Kingdom)
 6th Destroyer Squadron (United Kingdom)
 7th Destroyer Squadron (United Kingdom)
 8th Destroyer Squadron (United Kingdom)

Escorts

 British 21st Escort Squadron
 British 22nd Escort Squadron
 British 23rd Escort Squadron
 British 24th Escort Squadron
 British 25th Escort Squadron
 British 26th Escort Squadron
 British 27th Escort Squadron
 British 28th Escort Squadron
 British 29th Escort Squadron
 British 30th Escort Squadron

Fast patrol boats

 Coastal Forces Squadron formerly British 1st Fast Patrol Boat Squadron
 British 2nd Fast Patrol Boat Squadron
 1st Patrol Boat Squadron – formerly the Inshore Training Squadron - renamed Coastal Forces Squadron circa June 2020, seemingly with HMS Smiter (P272).

Fisheries

 Overseas Patrol Squadron(formerly the Fisheries Patrol Squadron)

Frigates

 1st Frigate Squadron
 2nd Frigate Squadron
 3rd Frigate Squadron – postwar, was with Far East Fleet, at Singapore and Hong Kong. On 21 November 1960, the 3rd Frigate Squadron, together for the last time, shaped course for Singapore.
Made up of Amazon class frigates in the 1980s. 
 5th Frigate Squadron
 6th Frigate Squadron
 7th Frigate Squadron
 8th Frigate Squadron
 9th Frigate Squadron
 17th Frigate Squadron
 20th Frigate Squadron – anti-submarine warfare training squadron based in Londonderry Port during the 1960s.

Heavy
 Heavy Squadron, (1951–1954) consisted of mixed naval units including the battleship, aircraft carriers and cruisers of the Home fleet.

Minesweepers

Coastal minesweepers

 British 100th Minesweeper Squadron
 British 101st Minesweeper Squadron
 British 105th Minesweeper Squadron
 British 106th Minesweeper Squadron
 British 108th Minesweeper Squadron
 British 120th Minesweeper Squadron Hong Kong 1951–1962

Fleet minesweepers

 British 1st Minesweeper Squadron
 British 2nd Minesweeper Squadron
 British 3rd Minesweeper Squadron
 British 4th Minesweeper Squadron
 British 5th Minesweeper Squadron
 British 6th Minesweeper Squadron

Inshore minesweepers

 British 50th Minesweeper Squadron
 British 51st Minesweeper Squadron
 British 52nd Minesweeper Squadron
 British 232nd Minesweeper Squadron

Mine counter-measures

 1st Mine Counter-Measures Squadron
 2nd Mine Counter-Measures Squadron
 3rd Mine Counter-Measures Squadron
 5th Mine Counter-Measures Squadron
 6th Mine Counter-Measures Squadron
 7th Mine Counter-Measures Squadron
 8th Mine Counter-Measures Squadron Hong Kong 1962–1967
 9th Mine Counter-Measures Squadron Persian Gulf 1962–1971 & 2013–present
 10th Mine Counter-Measures Squadron
 11th Mine Counter-Measures Squadron Falklands Conflict 1982

Submarines

 1st Submarine Squadron (United Kingdom) (SM1) – HMS Dolphin, Gosport.
 2nd Submarine Squadron (United Kingdom)  – HMNB Devonport, Plymouth.
 3rd Submarine Squadron (United Kingdom)  – HMNB Clyde, Faslane, until amalgamated with SM10 in 1993 to become 1st Submarine Squadron.
 4th Submarine Squadron (United Kingdom) – with China Station 1939. With headquarters at Singapore, the then-named Fourth Submarine Flotilla comprised Rorqual, Grampus, Regent, Rover, Parthian, Olympus, Proteus, Regulus, Rainbow, Phoenix, Perseus, Pandora Orpheus, Odin, and Otus. Trincomalee May 1944, Perth, Australia, after October 1944 supported by the depot ship . Australia postwar (decision to host flotilla seems to have been made in 1949).
 5th Submarine Squadron (United Kingdom) – Malta.
 6th Submarine Squadron (United Kingdom) alternately rendered as 6th Submarine Division – Halifax, Nova Scotia.
 7th Submarine Squadron (United Kingdom) – Singapore.
 10th Submarine Squadron (United Kingdom) (SM10) – 30 November 1959, reformed at Singapore. Strategic nuclear missile submarines based HMNB Clyde, Faslane, until amalgamated into 1st Submarine Squadron, 1993.

Training

 Inshore Training Squadron – renamed the 1st Patrol Boat Squadron in 2002.
 British 2nd Training Squadron
 British 3rd Training Squadron
 British 4th Training Squadron
 Training Squadron, Home Fleet

Type flotillas

Destroyers
See Pennant number#Flotilla bands
 1st Destroyer Flotilla, deployments: 
 1907– 1909, Channel Fleet.
 1909–1912, Home Fleet, 1st Division
 1912–1914, 1st Fleet
 1914–1916, Grand Fleet
 1916–1918, Harwich Force
 1917–1918, Portsmouth Command
 1919–1925, Atlantic Fleet
 April 1925 until November 1939 renamed 5th Destroyer Flotilla in December 1939 is re-formed as 1st Destroyer Flotilla from 22nd Destroyer Flotilla.
 December 1939 – June 1940, Nore Command
 July 1940 – May 1945, Portsmouth Command
 September 1939 – December 1944, Mediterranean Fleet flotilla is assigned from its permanent commands to Mediterranean fleet. 
 2nd Destroyer Flotilla, deployments:
 1907–1909, Home Fleet
 1909–1912, Home Fleet, 2nd Division
 1912–1914, 1st Fleet
 1914–1916, Grand Fleet
 1916–1917, Plymouth Command-Devonport
 1917–1918, Coast of Ireland Station-Londonderry
 1919–1924, Atlantic Fleet
 1924–1932, Mediterranean Fleet
 1932–1936, Home Fleet 
 1936 – September 1939, Mediterranean Fleet
 September 1939 – May 1940 - Dispersed to South Atlantic & West Indies
 June 1940 – February 1942, Mediterranean Fleet
 1942 – 1943, Eastern Fleet
 3rd Destroyer Flotilla: (1910–1945)
 1939 Mediterranean Fleet [[HMS Inglefield (D02)|HMS Inglefield''']] (F)
 5th Destroyer Division HMS Ilex, HMS Isis, HMS Imperial, HMS Imogen
 6th Destroyer Division HMS Ivanhoe, HMS Impulsive, HMS Intrepid, HMS Icarus
 1954 Home Fleet HMS St. Kitts
 4th Destroyer Flotilla: (1910–1940)
 1939 Mediterranean Fleet HMS Afridi (F)
 7th Destroyer Division HMS Afridi, HMS Gurkha, HMS Mohawk, HMS Sikh
 8th Destroyer Division HMS Cossack, HMS Maori, HMS Nubian, HMS Zulu
 1945 British Pacific Fleet HMAS Quickmatch, HMAS Quiberon, HMAS Queenborough, .
 1951 Home Fleet 
 5th Destroyer Flotilla: 1932 Home Fleet (1910–1933)
 1948 Home Fleet HMS St. Kitts
 6th Destroyer Flotilla: (1912–1943)–1932 Home Fleet; 1939 Home Fleet HMS Somali
 1939 11th Destroyer Division HMS Matabele, HMS Ashanti, HMS Mashona, HMS Somali(F)
 1939 12th Destroyer Division HMS Punjabi, HMS Tarter, HMS Bedouin, HMS Eskimo 
 7th Destroyer Flotilla: (1912–1944) – 1941 British Eastern Fleet HMAS Norman, HMAS Napier, HMAS Nestor and HMAS Nizam.
 8th Destroyer Flotilla: 
 1939 Home Fleet; HMS Faulknor
 1939 15th Destroyer Division HMS Foxhound, HMS Fearless, HMS Fury, HMS Forester
 1939 16th Destroyer Division HMS Foresight, HMS Fortune, HMS Fame, HMS Firedrake 
 1940 Force H HMS Faulknor, HMS Forester, HMS Foresight, HMS Firedrake, HMS Fortune, HMS Fearless, HMS Fury, HMS Foxhound
 9th Destroyer Flotilla:
 10th Destroyer Flotilla:1940 Mediterranean Fleet
 19th Destroyer Division (Scrap Iron Flotilla) , HMAS Vampire, HMAS Voyager, HMAS Vendetta, HMAS Waterhen 
 20th Destroyer Division HMS Dainty, HMS Diamond, HMS Decoy, HMS Defender
 11th Destroyer Flotilla: 1939 Home Fleet HMS Vanquisher, HMS Vansittart, HMS Walker, HMS Warwick, HMS Whirlwind and HMS Winchelsea
 12th Destroyer Flotilla
 13th Destroyer Flotilla
 14th Destroyer Flotilla:1942 Mediterranean Fleet HMS Jervis, Javelin, Kelvin, Nubian, Pakenham, Paladin and Petard 15th Destroyer Flotilla
 1939 Rosyth Command 
 29th Destroyer Division HMS Broke, HMS Wanderer, HMS Whitehall, HMS Witch 
 30th Destroyer Division HMS Wolverine, HMS Witherington, HMSVolunteer, HMS Verity 
 16th Destroyer Flotilla 1939 Portsmouth Command
 17th Destroyer Flotilla
 18th Destroyer Flotilla 1939 Home Fleet (1939–1939 (transferred to RCN)
 19th Destroyer Flotilla:
 1939 Nore Command HMS Codrington (F) 
 37th Destroyer Division HMS Basilisk, HMS Beagle, HMS Boreas  
 38th Destroyer Division HMS Blanche, HMS Brazen, HMS Brilliant, HMS Boadicea 
 1940 Force H HMS Lagos, HMS Laforey, HMS Lightning, HMS Lance, HMS Lively
1945 to 1946 HMS Trafalgar (flotilla leader), HMS Armada, HMS Barfleur, HMS Hogue, HMS Lagos, HMS Camperdown and HMS Finisterre.
 20th Destroyer Flotilla
 21st Destroyer Flotilla:1939 China Station HMS Duncan, HMS Decoy, HMS Defender, HMS Delight, HMS Duchess, HMS Dainty, HMS Daring, HMS Diamond and HMS Diana
 22nd Destroyer Flotilla
 23rd Destroyer Flotilla: formerly French small destroyers Bouclier, Branlebas, L'Incomprise, La Cordeliere, La Flore, La Melpomène 24th Destroyer Flotilla
 25th Destroyer Flotilla: 1945 British Pacific Fleet HMS Grenville, HMS Ulster, HMS Undine, HMS Urania, HMS Undaunted, HMS Ursa, HMS Ulysses, HMS Urchin
 27th Destroyer Flotilla: 1945 British Pacific Fleet HMS Kempenfelt, HMS Wager, HMS Wakeful, HMS Wessex, HMS Whelp, HMS Whirlwind, .
 28th Destroyer Flotilla:
 29th Destroyer Flotilla:

Escorts

 British 1st Escort Flotilla
 British 2nd Escort Flotilla
 British 3rd Escort Flotilla
 British 4th Escort Flotilla
 British 5th Escort Flotilla

Local defences
Included:
 2nd Submarine Flotilla, (1914–1919)
 Clyde Local Defence flotilla (1914–1916)
 Devonport Local Defence flotilla (1914–1919)
 Devonport & Falmouth Local Defence flotilla
 Falmouth Local Defence flotilla (1915–1918)
 Firth of Forth Local Defence flotilla
 Gibraltar Local Defence flotilla
 Liverpool Local Defence flotilla
 Mersey Local Defence flotilla
 Newhaven Local Defence flotilla
 Nore Local Defence flotilla (1914–1919)
 North Channel Local Defence flotilla
 Milford & Pembroke Local Defence flotilla
 Pembroke Local Defence flotilla (1917–1919)
 Portland Local Defence flotilla
 Portsmouth Local Defence flotilla
 Queenstown Local Defence flotilla (1914–1915)

Minesweepers
 1st Minesweeper Flotilla
 2nd Minesweeper Flotilla
 3rd Minesweeper Flotilla
 4th Minesweeper Flotilla
 5th Minesweeper Flotilla
 1939 Nore Command: HMS Sphinx, HMS Niger, HMS Salamander, HMS Harrier, HMS Hussar, HMS Skipjack, HMS Halcyon, HMS Selkirk, HMS Speedwell 
 6th Minesweeper Flotilla
 7th Minesweeper Flotilla
 8th Minesweeper Flotilla
 9th Minesweeper Flotilla
 10th Minesweeper Flotilla
 11th Minesweeper Flotilla
 13th Minesweeper Flotilla
 14th Minesweeper Flotilla
 14th & 17th Minesweeper Flotilla, (1942–1944)
 15th Minesweeper Flotilla	Chatham	February 1944	
 18th Minesweeper Flotilla	Chatham	May 1943
 21st Minesweeper Flotilla	
 40th Minesweeper Flotilla	Harwich	1945	
 44nd Minesweeper Flotilla

Motor torpedo boats
 British 2nd MTB Flotilla
 British 10th MTB Flotilla
 British 58th MTB Flotilla

Port
 Portsmouth Flotilla, (2002–present)
 Devonport Flotilla, (2002–present)
 Faslane Flotilla, (2010–present) – in 2015 the remaining Trafalgar-class submarines of the Devonport Flotilla were administratively transferred to the Faslane Flotilla.

Submarine flotilla
numbered
 1st Submarine Flotilla,
 2nd Submarine Flotilla, (1914–1919)
 3rd Submarine Flotilla, (1914–1919)
 4th Submarine Flotilla, (1914–1919), (1939): Medway, Westcott, Grampus, Rorqual, Odin, Otus, Olympus, Parthian, Regent, Rover, Orpheus, Pandora, Perseus, Phoenix, Rainbow, Regulus, Proteus''
 5th Submarine Flotilla, (1914–1919)
 6th Submarine Flotilla, (1914–1919)
 7th Submarine Flotilla, (1914–1919) later part of Commander-in-Chief, South Atlantic.
 8th Submarine Flotilla, (1914–1919)
 9th Submarine Flotilla, (1914–1919)
 10th Submarine Flotilla, (1914–1919), based in Malta from January 1941
 11th Submarine Flotilla, (1914–1919)
 12th Submarine Flotilla, (1914–1919)
 13th Submarine Flotilla, (1914–1919)
 14th Submarine Flotilla, (1917–1919)
 15th Submarine Flotilla, (1914–1919)
 16th Submarine Flotilla, (1914–1919)

named
 Ambrose's Flotilla, (1917–1918)
 Mediterranean Fleet's Flotilla
 Platypus's Flotilla, (1917–1919)
 Vulcan's Flotilla, (1917–1919)
 Hong Kong Submarine Flotilla, (1914)

Training flotilla
 British 2nd Training Flotilla

References

Sources
 Mackie, Colin. (2017) Senior Royal Navy Appointments from 1865. Gulabin, http://www.gulabin.com/
 Nierhorster, Leo Dr. (2013) World War II Armed Forces – Orders of Battle and Organizations – British, Colonial, and Dominion Armed Forces –  British, Colonial, and Dominion Navies. http://niehorster.org/index.htm

Royal Navy squadrons
Royal Navy flotillas
Squadrons